The 2013 John Newcombe Women's Pro Challenge is a professional tennis tournament played on outdoor hard courts. It is the second edition of the tournament which is part of the 2013 ITF Women's Circuit, offering a total of $50,000 in prize money. It takes place in New Braunfels, Texas, United States, on October 28–November 3, 2013.

WTA entrants

Seeds 

 1 Rankings as of October 21, 2013

Other entrants 
The following players received wildcards into the singles main draw:
  Rosalia Alda
  Jacqueline Cako
  Julia Elbaba
  Ashley Weinhold

The following players received entry from the qualifying draw:
  Danielle Lao
  Jessica Lawrence
  Mari Osaka
  Blair Shankle

The following players received entry by a junior exempt:
  Taylor Townsend

The following players received entry by a protected ranking:
  Ulrikke Eikeri

Champions

Singles 

  Anna Tatishvili def.  Elitsa Kostova 6–4, 6–4

Doubles 

  Anna Tatishvili /  CoCo Vandeweghe def.  Asia Muhammad /  Taylor Townsend, 3–6, 6–3, [13–11]

External links 
 2013 John Newcombe Women's Pro Challenge at ITFtennis.com
 

2013 ITF Women's Circuit
2013 in American sports